Henry de Botebrigge or Henry of Budbridge (died c.1331) was a 13th-14th century abbot in the Isle of Wight. He was the Abbot of Quarr Abbey and once held the Great Budbridge Manor. His heir was Robert de Botebrigge, reported to have become heir in 1331 when he requested a grant.

References

English abbots
13th-century English Roman Catholic priests
14th-century English Roman Catholic priests
Clergy from the Isle of Wight
1331 deaths
Year of birth unknown